The 2021 Atlantic Coast Conference football season, part of the 2021 NCAA Division I FBS football season, was the 69th season of college football play for the Atlantic Coast Conference (ACC). It began on September 2, 2021, and ended on December 31, 2021. The ACC consists of 14 members in two divisions.

The entire 2021 schedule was released on January 28, 2021.

Previous season
Clemson defeated Notre Dame 34–10 in the ACC Football Championship Game. The victory, along with a 10–1 regular season record, earned Clemson a berth in the College Football Playoff.  The Tigers were the number two seed in the playoff and faced Ohio State in the 2021 Sugar Bowl, where the Tigers lost 28–49.

Preseason

ACC Kickoff
The 2021 ACC Kickoff was held on July 21 and 22nd at the Westin hotel in Charlotte, North Carolina.  Each team had their head coach and three players available to talk to the media at the event.  Coverage of the event was televised on ACC Network.  On July 26, 2021, the ACC Preseason Media Poll was released, which projected Clemson to win its 7th consecutive ACC title.

Preseason ACC Player of the Year
Source:

Preseason All-Conference Teams
Source:

Offense

Defense

Specialist

Preseason Award Watchlists

Recruiting classes

Coaches

Coaching changes 
There are no coaching changes for the 2021 season.

Head coaching records 

Notes
Records shown after the 2021 season
Years at school includes the 2021 season

Rankings

Schedule
The regular season will begin on September 2 and will end on November 27.  The ACC Championship game is scheduled for December 4, 2021.

Regular season

Week one

Week two

Week three

Week four

Week five

Week six

Week seven

Week eight

Week nine

Week ten

The game between North Carolina and Wake Forest is being played as a non-conference game and will therefore not count in the conference standings.

Week eleven

Week twelve

Week thirteen

Championship game

ACC vs other conferences

ACC vs Power Five matchups 
The following games include ACC teams competing against Power Five conferences teams from the Big Ten, Big 12, BYU/Notre Dame, Pac-12 and SEC). All rankings are from the AP Poll at the time of the game.

ACC vs Group of Five matchups
The following games include ACC teams competing against teams from the American, C-USA, MAC, Mountain West or Sun Belt.

ACC vs FBS independents matchups
The following games include ACC teams competing against FBS Independents, which includes Army, Liberty, New Mexico State, UConn or UMass.

ACC vs FCS matchups
The Football Championship Subdivision comprises 13 conferences and two independent programs.

Records against other conferences

Regular Season

Post Season

Postseason

Bowl games

  
 
For the 2020–2025 bowl cycle, The ACC will have annually ten appearances in the following bowls: Orange Bowl and Peach Bowl (unless they are selected for playoffs filled by a SEC and at-large team if champion is in the playoffs), Military Bowl, Duke's Mayo Bowl, Gator Bowl, Cheez-It Bowl, Fenway Bowl, Outback Bowl, Holiday Bowl and Sun Bowl. The ACC teams will go to a New Year's Six bowl if a team finishes higher than the champions of Power Five conferences in the final College Football Playoff rankings. The ACC champion are also eligible for the College Football Playoff if they're among the top four teams in the final CFP ranking.

Rankings are from AP Poll. Rankings are from CFP rankings. All times Eastern Time Zone. ACC teams shown in bold.
The Gator Bowl opponent for Wake Forest was originally scheduled to be Texas A&M. Due to COVID-19 issues with Texas A&M, they were replaced with Rutgers.
The Sun Bowl originally scheduled Miami to face Washington, but Miami had to withdraw due to COVID-19 issues.
The Military Bowl originally scheduled Boston College to face East Carolina, but Boston College had to withdraw due to COVID-19 issues.
The Fenway Bowl originally scheduled Virginia to face SMU, but Virginia had to withdraw due to COVID-19 issues.

Awards and honors

Player of the week honors

All Conference Teams

Source:

First Team

Second Team

Third Team

ACC individual awards

ACC Player of the Year
 Kenny Pickett, Pittsburgh
ACC Rookie of the Year
 Tyler Van Dyke, Miami
ACC Coach of the Year
Dave Clawson, Wake Forest

ACC Offensive Player of the Year
 Kenny Pickett, Pittsburgh
ACC Offensive Rookie of the Year
 Tyler Van Dyke, Miami
Jacobs Blocking Trophy
 Ikem Ekwonu, NC State

ACC Defensive Player of the Year
 Jermaine Johnson II, Florida State
ACC Defensive Rookie of the Year
 Andrew Mukuba, Clemson

All-Americans

Consensus All-Americans 

Currently, the NCAA compiles consensus all-America teams in the sports of Division I FBS football and Division I men's basketball using a point system computed from All-America teams named by coaches associations or media sources.  Players are chosen against other players playing at their position only.  To be selected a consensus All-American, players must be chosen to the first team on at least half of the five official selectors as recognized by the NCAA.  Second- and third-team honors are used to break ties.  Players named first-team by all five selectors are deemed unanimous All-Americans. Currently, the NCAA recognizes All-Americans selected by the AP, AFCA, FWAA, TSN, and the WCFF to determine consensus and unanimous All-Americans.

Associated Press

AFCA

FWAA

The Sporting News

WCFF

National Awards 
 Johnny Unitas Golden Arm Award: Kenny Pickett, Pittsburgh

Home game attendance

Bold – Exceeded capacity
†Season High

NFL Draft

Total Picks by School

List of Selections

References